The Geological Museum of the Dolomites (in Italian Museo Geologico delle Dolomiti) is located in Predazzo, Fiemme Valley, in the Trentino Italian province. It is managed by the Comune of Predazzo and the Science Museum (MUSE) of Trento since 2012.

History 
It was founded in 1899 in order to valorize the geological and natural heritage of the Dolomites through dedicated expositions of minerals, fossils, rocks, etc. After being transferred a few times during the XX century, it has its basis in the former "house of tourism and handicraft" in the main square of the village.

In 2009, together with the Dolomites, it was inserted in the World Heritage List by UNESCO.

In 2012 it became part of the MUSE (Science Museum of Trento).

The refurbishment of summer 2015 has contributed to valorize both the collection and the origins of the museum itself. The initial interest for the geology of the Dolomites took in fact place in the XVIII century, in the form of explorations and studies conducted by scientists coming from all over the world. Geologists, naturalists, explorers and scientists gathered in the hotel "Nave D'Oro" (Golden Ship) of Predazzo in order to study the peculiar geological formations in the area: Alexander von Humboldt, Jean Baptiste Elie de Beaumont, Charles Lyell, Roderick Murchison, Amelia Edwards and many more.

Exposition 

The museum owns more than 12,000 pieces, both geologic and fossil, and the hugest collection of invertebrates fossils of the Middle-Triassic cliffs in all Italy. It manages also an external educational itinerary, called "Dos Capèl geological path" (from Italian: Sentiero Geologico del Dos Capèl), that can be viseted during summer.

The museum is located in the main square of Predazzo. After the refurbishment of 2015, the hall remember the historical hotel "Nave d'Oro" (Golden Ship), with testimonials of the flourishing scientific and geological studies of the 18th century. The ground floor hosts an exposition regarding the history of the Dolomites and their scientific discovery. In the basement it is possible to explore the different mountain chains of Fiemme Valley and Fassa Valley: Lagorai, Latemar, Catinaccio, Marmolada-Monzoni and Sella.

The museum hosts also a scientific library with over 4,000 volumes regarding geology, mineralogy and paleontology, with a specific section dedicated to history and antiques.

Dos Capèl geological path 

The "Dos Capèl geological path" (in Italian: sentiero geologico del Dos Capèl) is an educational and hiking itinerary. Created in 1970, it was restored around 2000 and connected to the Museum of Predazzo as its open-air extension. The starting point is located in Pampeago (1860 m a.s.l.) and consists of a circular itinerary around the mountain Dos Capèl (2200 m a.s.l.) with 32 steps having informative panels, pictures and descriptions, in order to learn and observe in person. It is possible to reach this itinerary also from Passo Feudo, by the cable car of Ski Center Latemar.

See also 

 Dolomites
 Predazzo

References

External links 

 Official website, on muse.it
 Geological Museum of the Dolomites, on the Comune of Predazzo (in Italian)
 Geological Museum of the Dolomites on visitfiemme.it (in Italian)
 Facebook official page

Geology museums
History museums in Italy